List of universities in Ho Chi Minh City. There are over 80 universities and colleges (for a full list of colleges in Ho Chi Minh City, see List of colleges in Ho Chi Minh City) with over 400,000 students. There are over 100 vocational schools  in Ho Chi Minh City, Vietnam.  The university students in Vietnam have to spend 4.5 to 5 years in university (when graduating, they will get a diploma of bachelor of arts (science faculties, basic faculty, social faculties) or engineer (technical faculties) while the college student spend about 3 to 3.5 years in colleges (then they may get a university diploma if they spend about 1.5 years in universities). The vocational school students spend 2 or 2.5 years). Universities in Ho Chi Minh City, Vietnam are tabulated alphabetically as follows:
Academy of Aviation of Vietnam
Banking University of Ho Chi Minh City
Conservatory of Ho Chi Minh City
Hoa Sen University
Ho Chi Minh City Architecture University
Fulbright University Vietnam
Ho Chi Minh City Fine Arts University
Ho Chi Minh City University of Food Industry (Trường Đại Học Công Nghiệp Thực Phẩm)
Ho Chi Minh City International University
Ho Chi Minh City University of Industry (Trường Đại học Công nghiệp Thành phố Hồ Chí Minh)
Ho Chi Minh City Medicine and Pharmacy University
Ho Chi Minh City University of Teacher Training
Ho Chi Minh City Open University
Ho Chi Minh City University of Agriculture and Sylviculture
Ho Chi Minh City University of Culture
Ho Chi Minh City University of Economics and Finance
Ho Chi Minh City University of Economics and Law
Ho Chi Minh City University of Finance and Marketing(Trường Đại học Tài chính Marketing)
Ho Chi Minh City University of Information Technology
Ho Chi Minh City University of Law
Ho Chi Minh City University of Social Sciences and Humanities
Ho Chi Minh City University of Technology and Education
Ho Chi Minh City University of Transportation (Trường Đại Học Giao Thông Vận Tải TP HCM)
Hong Bang university
HUTECH University of Technology (Trường Đại học Kỹ thuật Công nghệ TP.HCM)
National Academy of Public Administration (Vietnam) (one campus in Hanoi, one in Ho Chi Minh City)
Nguyen Tat Thanh University
Pham Ngoc Thach University of Medicine
Posts and Telecommunications Institute of Technology Ho Chi Minh City
Royal Melbourne Institute of Technology campus in Ho Chi Minh City
Saigon University
Saigon Technology University
Sports and Physical Gymnastics University II
Ton Duc Thang University
University of Economics, Ho Chi Minh City 
University of Natural Sciences
Van Hien University
Van Lang University
Vietnam National University, Ho Chi Minh City
Ho Chi Minh City University of Technology (Trường Đại học Bách khoa TP. HCM )
Pacific Vietnam University campus in Ho Chi Minh City
Second Campus of Hanoi University of Transportation
Second Campus of University of Foreign Trade (Vietnam)
Second Campus of University of Security (Vietnam)
Second Campus of Water Resources University (Vietnam)

See also

Fulbright economics teaching program (University of Economics)
List of universities in Vietnam
List of colleges in Ho Chi Minh City

Universities in Ho Chi Minh City
Ho Chi Minh City